Yes! For Poland (T!DPL), officially called Association "Self-Governments for Poland" is a Polish association and local government movement founded on 31 August 2020 in Gdańsk. It is the largest association of local government activists in Poland.

History 
The association was founded on 31 August 2020 in Gdańsk, on the 40th anniversary of the signing of the August Agreements. It was entered into the register of associations on 6 October 2020 under the name "Self-Governments for Poland" Association. On 15 December 2021, a unification convention was held in Poznań, whose task was to merge seven local associations and elect a board. Jacek Karnowski, Mayor of Sopot, became the President of the Management Board.

On November 21, 2022, the Marshal of the Silesian Voivodeship Sejmik, Jakub Chełstowski, joined the association together with three councilors of the sejmik, who created the club of the association "Yes! for Poland” in the Sejmik, which resulted in the loss of the Law and Justice majority in this body.

From the beginning of the movement, it has opposed the centralization of power led by Mateusz Morawiecki's government and the reduction of local government revenues.

References 

Local government in Poland
Political parties established in 2020